Thomas Hymers (29 April 1935 – May 1987) was an English footballer who played as a defender (association football) in the Football League for Doncaster Rovers.

Career
Hymers was born in Thorne, which was then in the West Riding of Yorkshire. He worked in Frickley Colliery and also played for their football team. He joined Doncaster Rovers in 1958 and played in 22 matches during the 1959–60 season and five matches in 1960–61 which included Doncaster's first match in the League Cup, a 3–1 victory over Stoke City. Unfortunately for Hymers he scored an own goal, giving him the dubious honour of being Stoke's first goalscorer in the League Cup.

Career statistics

References

1935 births
1987 deaths
People from Thorne, South Yorkshire
Footballers from Doncaster
Association football defenders
English footballers
Frickley Athletic F.C. players
Doncaster Rovers F.C. players
English Football League players